John Trent Beaty-Pownall (30 July 1874 – 1 February 1961) was an English football pioneer who played as a forward for some of the earliest Catalan clubs in existence such as Barcelona Football Club and Sociedad de Foot-Ball de Barcelona, where he also stood out as a great striker, netting some of the very first goals in the history of Catalan football.

Playing career

Barcelona Football Club
Beaty-Pownall was born in Alicante on 30 July 1874. His older brother, Charles, was an officer of the Royal Navy. At some point in the early 1890s, the teenager Beaty-Pownall arrived in Barcelona. Work reasons bring him, like many other Britons who moved to the Catalan capital. In 1892, he met James Reeves, who was recruiting football enthusiasts to create a well-organized football club, and he joined him, having been impressed by his passionate and entrepreneurial spirit. Together with Reeves and some other pioneers in the city, such as Henry W. Brown, Henry Wood, the Morris brothers (Samuel, Enrique, and Miguel) and George Cockram, they formed the Barcelona Football Club in late 1892.

This entity organized the first known football match in the city, which was held at Hippodrome of Can Tunis on 25 December 1892. It remains unclear if he played in this match. However, he did play on 12 March 1893, in the historic match between a blue and a red team, starting as a forward for the latter in a 1–2 loss. Beaty-Pownall appears in what is regarded to be the oldest photograph of a football team in Spain, which depicts these two sides before the match at Can Tunis. He was four months shy of his 19th birthday and he can be seen seated, the second from the left, alongside fellow youngsters such as Higgins, Bell, and a 13-year-old boy Miguel Morris.

Sociedad de Foot-Ball de Barcelona
In late 1894, a conflict between the club's members caused the entity to split into two groups, which led to its change of name to the Sociedad de Foot-Ball de Barcelona, with whom he played several training matches (Blue vs reds), including the one on 2 February 1895, in which the Blues, captained by Reeves, played against the Reds, captained by Beaty-Pownall himself, and he led by example with a goal to help his side to a 4–1 victory. Beaty-Pownall also played both games against Asociación de Foot-Ball de Torelló on 24 March and 14 April 1895, which was the very first time that teams from two different cities played against each other in Catalonia, and he rose to the occasion, netting once at Bonanova in an 8–3 local win and a brace at Torelló in a 3–5 loss.

Parsons played several friendly matches at Can Tunis and a few others at Bonanova between 1892 and 1895, where he stood out as a great goal scorer, however, due to the little statistical rigor that the newspapers had at that time, the exact amount of goals he netted is unknown. Despite some encouraging first steps, this Society was never officially established and when its founder and captain James Reeves returned to the United Kingdom in the autumn of 1895, the club began to decline and disappeared around 1896.

Later life
His sister, Katherine Margaret Beaty-Pownall (1869–1942), married Henry Wood, who was one of his teammates at Barcelona Football Club, and after his death in 1907, she married another one of his teammates, this time James Revees, with whom she had an only child in 1910, John Pownall Reeves. He died in Winchester on 1 February 1961, at the age of 86.

References

1874 births
1961 deaths
English footballers
Association football forwards
English expatriate footballers
English expatriate sportspeople in Spain
Expatriate footballers in Spain